Neepawa is a town in Manitoba, Canada located on the Yellowhead Highway at the intersection with Highway 5.  its population was 5,685. Neepawa was incorporated as a town in 1883. It is bordered by the Municipality of North Cypress – Langford and Rural Municipality of Rosedale. Neepawa is the self-proclaimed Lily capital of the world in part because of its Lily Festival.

History
In the many years before European settlement, the lands around Neepawa were primarily used by the Cree and the Assiniboine. Native peoples in the area followed a regular cycle by following the Plains Bison to take shelter in the areas north of Neepawa in the winter, and then heading south again across the plains and beyond Neepawa in the summer. The town name of Neepawa comes from the Cree word for "Land of Plenty", the name was first used around 1873. Prior to settlement, the only Europeans in the area were primarily fur traders, many people made their way through the area on the North Fort Ellice Trail which went from the Red River to Edmonton. It was on this trail that a group of settlers from Listowel, Ontario eventually decided to settle in 1877, where the Stony and Boggy creeks meet.

The Neepawa area was in what was then known as "The Northwest Territories", just to the west of the 1870 boundary of Manitoba. During the next 30 years, many settlers came to live in the area. The first settlers were from the British Isles. Eastern European settlers also came from countries such as Poland and Hungary and built the Hun Valley Settlement near Neepawa. Neepawa only joined Manitoba when the western edge of the then "postage stamp province" was expanded to its present western borders in 1881.

John A. Davidson and Jonathon J. Hamilton arrived in the town in 1880, they were the first real business men of the town buying land and surveying them into lots. In 1881 John Hamilton and John Davidson built a store and a grist mill near the junction of Boggy and Stoney Creeks. Like many western Manitoba towns at the time, Neepawa eagerly await the arrival of the railway in the 1880s. Sometime after the railway reached Gladstone, Manitoba in 1882, Davidson and Hamilton offered the Manitoba and Northwestern Railway (which was leased to CPR) a land grant and a financial bonus of $16,000 to construct their line within the town limits and the railway agreed to build their station within Neepawa.

Soon a village grew and on the 23 of September, 1883 the town of Neepawa was incorporated. David Howard Harrison who owned a private bank in Neepawa was elected Premier of Manitoba in 1887.  Neepawa's first hospital was completed in 1904 and had the capacity for 20 patients. The hospital included a nursing school. Neepawa's first school opened in 1881. It was a three-story building finally completed in 1898 and used until 1928. The Neepawa Salt Company mined salt here from 1932 until 1970.

Author Margaret Laurence wrote several books through the 1960s and 1970s, depicting the town under the name of Manawaka. On May 12, 2010 Neepawa was the host of Manitoba's 140th birthday party. The town was chosen as the site of the festivities as a result of winning a contest within the province.

Geography
Neepawa lies on the Manitoba Escarpment, the rolling hills around Neepawa are typical of the escarpment. Neepawa lies within the Canadian Prairies, the region around Neepawa is defined as Aspen parkland. Although Neepawa is part of the prairies the area to the north is heavily forested parkland. Riding Mountain National Park and Duck Mountain Provincial Park lie to the north, are part of this parkland, and are also an extension of the escarpment. The boreal forest which extends all the way across Canada and is also found to the north of Neepawa. Spruce Woods Provincial Park is located about 60 km south of the town.

Neepawa lies at the source of the Whitemud River, it is also about 40 km east of the Little Saskatchewan River, a tributary of the Assiniboine River which is 60 km south of the town. The town is also about 60 km west of Lake Manitoba, one of the largest lakes in Manitoba.

Climate

Demographics

Economy
The economy of Neepawa and the region is strongly dependent on agriculture. The rolling fields in the area support many types of crops and livestock operations. Neepawa serves as a major agricultural service centre for many of the producers in the region.

More prominently, growers in Neepawa produce some of the finest and most diverse lilies in the world. As of 2009 over 2,000 kinds of Lily were grown locally. These flowers are shipped directly from Neepawa to many of the major international floral markets. Neepawa proclaims itself the "Lily capital of the world" because of this. Neepawa also attracts a number of tourists throughout the year in part because of the lilies. An estimated 12,000 people visit the Lily Festival and Neepawa each July.

As well as being an agricultural centre, Neepawa's businesses serve as a shopping and retail centre for much of the area's residents.

Attractions

The Margaret Laurence Home is a designated Provincial Heritage Site and a Level 2 Museum. This is the house where Margaret Laurence grew up in Neepawa as a youth. In addition the Riverside Cemetery in Neepawa is the resting place of Margaret Laurence. The cemetery's Davidson Memorial was the signature of Laurence's book The Stone Angel. This cemetery is also the furthest west in which any Titanic passenger was buried. Four young men from the village of Fritham in Hampshire, England, went down with the Titanic in 1912: Lewis Hickman (aged 32), Leonard Mark Hickman (aged 24), Stanley George Hickman (aged 21), and Ambrose Hood (aged 21). A gravestone in memory of the Hickman brothers can be found in Riverside Cemetery. The Beautiful Plains Museum is a heritage railway station that was the home of the museum since 1981. The original railway station was built in 1901.

The Lily Festival in Neepawa first began in 1996 and today features the over 2,000 different kinds of Lily that are grown in Neepawa. Neepawa sees around 12,000 visitors in the town during the Lily Festival each July.

The Roxy Theatre Neepawa is a community-run theatre that was built in 1906. The theatre hosts live arts and films. The Roxy Theatre was the setting for the 2015 film Amityville Playhouse (UK/Europe release) or Amityville Theatre (U.S. release). Both the Roxy and the Towns Court House were used in the film (as were other locations in the town) which was shot in September 2014.

Sports
Junior and senior sports teams in Neepawa include:
 Neepawa Titans (Manitoba Junior Hockey League)
 Neepawa Cubs (Manitoba Junior B Baseball League)
 Neepawa Farmers (SR Hockey in THHL)

Government
Neepawa is governed by a town council consisting of a mayor and six councilors. The town council is elected to a four-year term. The current Mayor of Neepawa is Blake McCutcheon. The Deputy Mayor is Brian Hedley and the remaining council consists of Marijka Kostenchuk, Darren Pudlo, Murray Parrott, Jason Nadeau and Darryl Gerrard.

Transportation
Neepawa is located along Highway 16 (the Yellowhead Highway) and Highway 5 (the Parks Route). Neepawa Airport features a  runway that is able to service air ambulance and small jets.

Education
Hazel M. Kellington Elementary School (named after longtime teacher) has about 350 students and the Neepawa Area Collegiate Institute has about 500 students. Neepawa Nursery School teaches 3- and 4-year-old children. Neepawa is part of the Beautiful Plains School Division.

Assiniboine Community College has a campus in Neepawa and offers various post-secondary courses.

Media

Radio
CJBP-FM 97.1

Television
 NAC TV channel 30

Notable people
Gordon Beard, politician
Bertram Brooker, award-winning novelist
Shawn Byram, former professional hockey player
Glen Cummings (politician), politician
Fred Langdon Davis, politician
 Triston Grant, former professional hockey player
Charles F. Goodeve, chemist
Shane Hnidy, former professional hockey player
James H. Howden, politician 
Mark Kolesar, former professional hockey player 
Margaret Laurence, novelist
Bill Mikkelson, former professional hockey player
Kelly Robertson, professional curler
Welford Russell, composer and surgeon
Bill Stilwell, author
David Zieroth, poet

References

External links

Town of Neepawa

Towns in Manitoba
Populated places established in 1883
1883 establishments in Manitoba